Criminal is a series of four Netflix police procedural anthology TV series set in four countries. The four series are Criminal: France, Criminal: Germany, Criminal: Spain, and Criminal: UK. The series was devised by its showrunners George Kay and Jim Field Smith, and produced by their company Idiotlamp Productions. Although the showrunners are based in the UK, each of the local three-part series is written and performed in that country's native language by native actors,  but all four individual local series were shot on the same set in Madrid, Spain. All four series were released simultaneously in September 2019. A second series of Criminal: UK, consisting of four episodes, was released on 16 September 2020.

Each episode is a stand-alone psychological drama, consisting of the interrogation of an individual by a team of police investigators. Every scene is confined to just three areas in a single location; a police interrogation room, a darkened viewing room that looks into the interrogation room through a one-way mirror, and the hallway and stairwell outside the rooms.

Episodes

Criminal: France

Criminal: Germany

Criminal: Spain

Criminal: UK

Season 1 (2019)

Season 2 (2020)

References 

2010s anthology television series
2019 British television series debuts
2019 French television series debuts
2019 German television series debuts
2019 Spanish television series debuts
English-language Netflix original programming
Spanish-language Netflix original programming
French-language Netflix original programming
German-language Netflix original programming
Psychological drama television and other works
Television shows filmed in Spain